Belawan is a harbor in Medan, North Sumatra. Located on the northeast coast of Sumatra, Belawan is Indonesia's busiest seaport outside of Java. It constitutes the most northerly of the city of Medan's 21 administrative districts (kecamatan), and covers an area of 29.44 km2; at the 2010 Census it had a population of 95,506.

There are weekly passenger ships operated by Pelni from Medan to Tanjung Balai Karimun, Batam, Riau Islands and Tanjung Priok, Jakarta

A regular ferry service connects Belawan to across the Strait of Malacca to Penang, Malaysia; at times there was a ferry that also ran from Belawan to Phuket, Thailand and to Langkawi, Malaysia.

History
The port was initially built in 1890, to provide a location where tobacco could be transferred directly between rail lines from the interior and deep-draft ships. The harbor expanded in 1907 with the construction of a new section intended for Chinese and indigenous traders, reserving the existing port for European shipping. In the early twentieth century the port's business expanded, with the growth of major rubber and palm oil plantations in northern Sumatra. In the 1920s several major berthing facilities were built.

In 1938, the port was the largest port in the Dutch East Indies, in terms of cargo value. Cargo volumes dropped substantially after Indonesian independence, and did not reach pre-independence levels again until the mid-1960s.  A major restructuring in 1985 saw the construction of a container terminal; it almost immediately captured about one-fifth of Indonesia's containerized exports.  Major products exported include rubber, palm oil, tea, and coffee.

In early 2013, Belawan Port can serve 1.2 million twenty-foot equivalent units (TEUs) per year and still gradually expands to 2 million TEUs with Rp.975 billion ($89.7 million) fund.

References

External links
Airriess, Christopher A (1991). Global economy and port morphology in Belawan, Indonesia. Geographical Review 81(2):183-196.

Populated places in North Sumatra
B
B